Dan Sayre Groesbeck (September 8, 1878 - August 29, 1950) was an American illustrator, muralist, and designer of "visualization sketches" in the pre-cinematic era.

Life
Groesbeck was born on September 8, 1878, in California.

Groesbeck began his career as a reporter and illustrator in Los Angeles, and later in Denver and Chicago. His illustrations were published in the Chicago Tribune, Redbook, and Cosmopolitan Magazine.

Groesbeck painted murals inside the Santa Barbara County Courthouse, the Hotel Del Monte, and various other buildings. He designed "visualization sketches" for Cecil B. DeMille in the pre-cinematic era.

Groesbeck died on August 29, 1950, in Los Angeles, at age 71.

Further reading

References

1878 births
1950 deaths
Artists from Los Angeles
Painters from California
American muralists
American illustrators